The Sainte-Anne River is a tributary of the north shore of the Saint Lawrence River, whose mouth is located at Sainte-Anne-de-la-Pérade. This river flows in the province of Quebec, Canada, in the administrative regions of:
 Capitale-Nationale:
 La Jacques-Cartier Regional County Municipality (municipalities of Stoneham-et-Tewkesbury, Saint-Gabriel-de-Valcartier);
 Portneuf Regional County Municipality (municipalities of Saint-Raymond, Saint-Léonard-de-Portneuf, Sainte-Christine-d'Auvergne, Saint-Gilbert, Saint-Alban, Saint-Casimir);
Mauricie: Les Chenaux Regional County Municipality (municipality of Sainte-Anne-de-la-Pérade).

It is well known for ice fishing, with the primary catch being Tomcod, ( in French), during the winter at Ste-Anne-de-la-Pérade. A small village builds up from the end of December to mid-February.

It is also regionally known for flooding, especially in St-Raymond, and sometimes in St-Casimir.

Apart from the village areas, forestry, recreational tourism and agriculture are the main economic activities on this hydrographic side.

The surface of the Sainte-Anne river (except the rapids areas) is generally frozen from the beginning of December to the end of March; however, safe circulation on the ice is generally done from the end of December to the beginning of March. The water level of the river varies with the seasons and the precipitation; the spring flood occurs in March or April.

Toponymy 
The origin of the name of the river is unknown. Samuel de Champlain gave it the name of Sainte-Marie river in 1609 without specifying its reasons. It was registered under the name of Sainte-Anne river on the map of Jean Bourdon of 1641, an appellation which quickly became essential. The Hurons, meanwhile, call it .

The toponym Rivière Sainte-Anne was formalized on December 5, 1968 at the Commission de toponymie du Québec.

Geography

Course 

Upper course of the Sainte-Anne river (segment of )

  towards the south-east in particular by crossing Lake Gabriella and Lake Georgiana to the dam at its mouth;
  towards the east by forming a hook towards the north, up to the confluence of the outlet of Lake Henry (coming from the south);
  eastwards forming an S, to the outlet (coming from the north) of a set of lakes including Holcombe and Nolin lakes;
  to the south in a deep valley passing on the west side of Mont des Chutes, to the outlet of a lake (coming from the east);
  south in a steep valley, to Markham Creek (coming from the east);
  to the south in a deep valley by forming two hooks towards the east at the end of the segment, up to the Chézine River (coming from the northwest);

Intermediate course of the Sainte-Anne river, downstream of the Chézine river (segment of )

  to the south in a deep valley, to the Pimbina stream (coming from the northwest);
  to the south crossing a small plain, collecting the outlet of Lake Chauveau (coming from the northwest), then branching east, to the confluence of the Tourilli River (coming from the northeast);
  to the south, bypassing a few islands, until the confluence of the Talayarde River (coming from the north-west);
  to the south in a deep valley, until the confluence of the Verte River (coming from the north-west);

Intermediate course of the Sainte-Anne river, downstream from the Bras du Nord (segment of )

  towards the south passing in front of the hamlet Chute-Panet (east bank), bypassing an island, forming a loop towards the east designated Pointe Basse, then branching towards the southwest to the Ford Falls located near Domaine-des-Chutes-Sud (east bank) and Domaine-des-Chutes-Nord (west bank);
  southwards passing under the road bridge designated Ponts des Cascades, and passing on the west side of the village of Sainte-Christine-d'Auvergne, up to the confluence from the Jacquot River (coming from the northwest);

Intermediate course of the Sainte-Anne river, downstream of the Jacquot river (segment of )
  to the south by crossing rapids, forming a loop to the east, then crossing other series of rapids, to the discharge (coming from the west) of an unidentified lake;
  to the south by forming two loops to the east, and passing in front of the village of Saint-Alban, up to the Saint-Alban dam;
  towards the south-west, up to a bend of the river corresponding to a small bay stretching towards the west;
  towards the south by forming a curve towards the east to pass near the hamlet "Trou du Diable", up to the railway bridge;
  towards the south-west, bypassing a dozen small islands, until the confluence of the Noire River (coming from the North-West);

Lower course of the Sainte-Anne river, upstream of Saint-Casimir (segment of )

  first towards the south while bending slightly towards the west to pass under the bridge of the village of Saint-Casimir, by collecting the Niagarette River (coming from the west), then by bending to the southwest and bypassing the island at Leboeuf, as far as Village-Sainte-Catherine (located on the west bank);
  to the south by crossing several series of rapids including the Rapide Sud and the Rapide d'en Bas, as well as bypassing the Tessier Islands and Sadoth, to the Charest River (coming from the northwest);
  east to the two bridges of the autoroute 40;
  to the east by collecting the Montée d'Enseigne stream (coming from the north), passing under the railway bridge and bending south-east to the village bridge;
  to the south, bypassing Île Lacoursière located opposite the hamlet L'Île-à-Lafond (north shore), to its mouth.

Hydrology 
Its average flow at its mouth is 78 m3/s. The main tributaries of the river are, from upstream to downstream, the Tourilli River, the Chézine River, the Talayarde River, the Bras du Nord, Jacquot River, Noire River, Blanche River, Niagarette River and Charest River. It also includes  of watercourse. The basin includes 828 lakes, the most important of which are Lakes Montauban, Long, Blanche, Carillon and Clair.

Geology 
Sainte-Anne is part of two geological provinces. Upstream of Saint-Alban, the subsoil is part of the Laurentides, and is composed of igneous rocks and metamorphic, mainly gneiss and granite, resistant to erosion. The river enters the St. Lawrence Lowlands downstream from Saint-Alban and the source rock consists mainly of limestone and shale from the Paleozoic.

Population 
It is estimated that there were approximately 16000 people who lived in the Sainte-Anne basin in 2001. The town of Saint-Raymond alone has half the population of the basin. Four other villages are located on the course of the river, namely Sainte-Christine-d'Auvergne, Saint-Alban, Saint-Casimir and Sainte-Anne-de-la-Pérade.

Natural environments 

The north of the basin is included in the ZECs ('controlled harvesting zone') of Zec de la Rivière-Blanche and Batiscan-Neilson as well as the Laurentides Wildlife Reserve. The southwest of the basin is included in the Lacs-Long-et-Montauban Regional Park.

The forest dominates, occupying 80% of the hydrographic basin. The public forest, which includes 56% of the forest area, is composed of 58% of mixed forests, 26% of coniferous and 16% of broadleaved. The basin extends over four bioclimatics areas, namely maple grove to linden, maple grove to yellow birch, the fir with yellow birch and the fir white birch.

The river and its tributaries is frequented by 33 species of fish. The main species used for sport fishing living in the river are brook trout (Salvelinus fontinalis), walleye (Sander vitreus) and the smallmouth bass (Micropterus dolomieu).

The river is also recognized as an important spawning ground for the Atlantic tomcod (Microgadus tomcod). There are between 600 and {800 million of individuals who come to breed in the river between December and February, two million of which are fished each year. The spawning ground would have been created in 1894 by a major landslide at Saint-Alban, giving the river a bottom of sand and gravel ideal for the reproduction of fish.

History 
The river was known to the St. Lawrence Iroquoians who already practiced there ice fishing around the year 1000.

The Atlantic tomcod population was rediscovered in the river in 1938. Ice fishing quickly became a popular activity, developing a village up to 1200 huts. The combined pressure of commercial fishing and sport fishing caused the decline of the fish population. To remedy this decline, a moratorium on commercial fishing was decreed in 1992 which enabled the tomcod population to recover.

Layout 

There are five dams on the Sainte-Anne river, three of which are used for hydroelectric production. These are the power stations of Saint-Alban, Chutes-à-Gorry and Glenford.

Notes and references

Bibliography

See also

 Sainte-Anne-de-la-Pérade
 Saint-Alban
 Saint-Casimir
 Lordship of Sainte-Anne-de-la-Pérade
 Blanche River
 Portneuf Regional County Municipality
 Les Chenaux Regional County Municipality
 List of rivers of Quebec

External links 

 

Rivers of Capitale-Nationale
Tributaries of the Saint Lawrence River
Laurentides Wildlife Reserve